Hands Inc., known as , is a Japanese department store formerly known as Tokyu Hands. Tokyu Hands opened their first store in Shibuya, Tokyo in 1976 as a DIY (Do-It-Yourself) store, hence the logo with two hands, and the emphasis on crafts and materials for projects.

The name Tokyu Hands was in reference to its then parent company, the Tokyu Group keiretsu. Cainz acquired the brand in March 2022 and renamed the store Hands.

Today, Hands focuses on hobby, home improvement and lifestyle products. At the Shibuya flagship store, products include toys, games, novelty items, gift cards, gift wrap, costumes, bicycles, travel products (such as luggage and camping gear), hobby materials, household hardware, tools, do-it-yourself kits, pet supplies, office supplies and stationery; calligraphy, painting, drawing supplies, furniture, lighting, home appliances, and storage solutions.

Most branches offer free workshops (in Japanese) and have demonstrations running on various floors during busy periods (weekends and holidays). There is a delivery service available for purchases that cannot be taken home on the day.

The Ikebukuro location featured a cat café called Nekobukuro, or "Cat's House", one of the first in the city to do so. For an additional admission fee, customers could visit with some 20 cats in the cafe. However, the Ikebukuro location underperformed as a whole and was closed on October 31, 2021.

Stores

Japan 
Hands operates 49 stores in Japan, including in:
 Shibuya
 Shinjuku
 Shinsaibashi
 Ginza

Singapore 
In Singapore, Hands opened its first store in Westgate in 2014, and currently operates five stores across the country:
Orchard Central
Suntec City
 Great World City
Jewel Changi Airport
Paya Lebar Quarter

Taiwan 
In 2000, an overseas branch of Tokyu Hands, named Hands Tailung (台隆手創館) opened in Taipei, Taiwan, in the Ximending area; as of 2017, Hands Tailung operates 15 stores in Taiwan.

References

External links 
 Official website 

Department stores of Japan
Tokyu Group
Hardware stores
1976 establishments in Japan
Retail companies established in 1976
Japanese companies established in 1976
2022 mergers and acquisitions